Tang Chenar or Tang-e Chenar may refer to:
 Tang Chenar, Yazd
 Tang Chenar Rural District, in Yazd Province